The grizzly bear (Ursus arctos ssp.) is the great brown bear of North America.

Grizzly Bear may also refer to:


Geography
 Grizzly Bear Lake, Grand Teton National Park, Wyoming, United States
 Saoyú or Grizzly Bear Mountain, a peninsula with a flat summit, Northwest Territories, Canada - see Saoyú-ʔehdacho

Entertainment
 Grizzly Bear (band), an indie band from Brooklyn, New York
 "Grizzly Bear", a 1966 single release from the album The Youngbloods''' by The Youngbloods
 "Grizzly Bear", a song from the album Angus & Julia Stone'' by Angus & Julia Stone
 Grizzly Bear (dance), a dance from the 1900s originating in San Francisco
 "The Grizzly Bear", a song by Irving Berlin

See also
 Grizzly (disambiguation)